Albert Oehlen (born 17 September 1954) is a German artist. He lives and works in Bühler, Switzerland and Segovia, Spain.

Early life and education
Born in Krefeld, West Germany, in 1954, Oehlen moved to Berlin in 1977, where he worked as a waiter and decorator with his friend, the artist Werner Büttner. He graduated from the Hochschule für bildende Künste Hamburg in 1978. Along with Martin Kippenberger and Georg Herold, Oehlen was a member of Berlin "bad boy" group.

Work
Closely associated with the Cologne art scene, Oehlen was a member of the Lord Jim Lodge, along with Martin Kippenberger among others. His art is related to the Neue Wilde movement. He has more recently been described as a 'free radical'.

Influenced by other German painters such as Georg Baselitz, Sigmar Polke and Gerhard Richter, Oehlen focuses on the process of painting itself. During the 1980s he began combining abstract and figurative elements of painting in his works, as part of a reaction to the prevailing Neo-Expressionist aesthetic of the time. In the following years, he worked within self-imposed, often absurd, parameters. He used only gray tones for his "Grey" paintings and limited himself to red, yellow, and blue for another series of what he calls "bad" paintings that included his infamous 1986 portrait of Adolf Hitler. In his paintings of the late 1990s, each piece consists of smears and lines of paint Oehlen brushed and sprayed over collaged imagery that had been transferred to canvas by the type of gigantic inkjet printers used to manufacture billboards.

In 2002, Oehlen exhibited the "Self-Portraits" series which included eight self-portraits among them  Frühstück Now (Self-Portrait)(1984), Self-Portrait With Open Mouth (2001) and Self-Portrait as a Dutch Woman (1983).

In Oehlen's recent work, flat, figurative cut-outs-all the products of computer-aided design (CAD), and gestural strokes of oil paint trade places in the service of collage. In his recent Finger Paintings, color-blocked advertisements are an extension of the canvas, providing fragmented, readymade surfaces for Oehlen's visceral markings, made with his hands, as well as brushes, rags, and spray-cans.

In 2014 Skarstedt Gallery, New York hosted Oehlen' "Fabric Paintings" exhibition, featuring fourteen of the twenty paintings made from 1992 to 1996, and mostly kept in his studio. In 2015 Oehlen had his first major New York exhibition, "Albert Oehlen: Home and Garden" at the New Museum of Contemporary Art a self-portraits selection from 1980s and 1990s.

Music
In the 1990s, Oehlen briefly ran his own independent label, Leiterwagen, putting out experimental electronica. Since the late 1990s Oehlen has played in the bands Red Krayola and Van Oehlen. References to music are frequent in his paintings and drawings. His artwork is on CDs by Gastr del Sol, Arthur Russell, and Brooklyn-based band Child Abuse.

Teaching
Oehlen was Professor of Painting at the Kunstakademie Düsseldorf from 2000 to 2009.

Personal life
Oehlen is the brother of fellow artist Markus Oehlen, and their father is also an artist. He lives with his wife, Esther Freund, and their three children in a village near Bühler.

Reception

Criticism
In 2013 ArtDaily described Oehlen as "one of the most influential, but also one of the most controversial of contemporary painters". His paintings are also frequently compared with David Salle's. However his work has not been met with universal approval. Philippe Dagen, writing in Le Monde about Oehlen's 2011 exhibition in Nîmes, concluded that he was "of only limited importance. With about 30 canvases he reveals his system with absolute, but unfortunately appalling, clarity." His paintings were devoid of "any form of expression or psychic density". His 2007 painting, Loa, is now part of the UK's Tate Collection.

Art market
The Galerie Max Hetzler gave Oehlen his first solo show in 1981. At a 2014 Christie's auction in London, one of Oehlen's self-portraits from 1984 was sold for $1.8 million, roughly three times its $670,000 high estimate. At a March 2017 Christie's auction, Albert's Self-Portrait with Palette sold for $3,623,230. In June 2019, at a Sotheby's auction in London, his Self-Portrait with Empty Hands sold to dealer Per Skarstedt for $7,542,157, a new record for the artist.

Exhibitions
Oehlen has shown work internationally in many exhibitions including I Will Always Champion Good Painting at Whitechapel Art Gallery in London (2006), Grounswell at the Museum of Modern Art in New York (2005), Provins – Legende at Museet for Samtidskunst in Roskilde, Denmark and Spiegelbilder 1982–1985 at Max Hetzler gallery in Berlin (2005). In 2013 a retrospective of his entire oeuvre from the 1980s to 2005 consisting of over 80 works was held at MUMOK, Vienna. Oehlen's work was included in the 2013 Venice Biennale. A survey of more than 30 years of work was exhibited at the Cleveland Museum of Art from 4 December 2016 until 12 March 2017.

Selected solo exhibitions
 Sculptures and Works on Paper, Galerie Max Hetzler, Marfa, 2022
 Works on Paper and a Sculpture, Gagosian, Athensa, 2022
 Carroll Dunham / Albert Oehlen, Galerie Max Hetzler, London, 2021
 unverständliche braune Bilder, Galerie Max Hetzler, Berlin, 2021
 Ömega Man, Reena Spaulings, Los Angeles
 Tramonto Spaventoso, Gagosian, Beverly Hills, 2021
 Carroll Dunham / Albert Oehlen. Bäume / Trees, Sprengel Museum Hannover, Hanover (travelled from Kunsthalle Düsseldorf, Dusseldorf) (catalogue), 2020
 Carroll Dunham / Albert Oehlen. Bäume / Trees, Kunsthalle Düsseldorf, Düsseldorf, 2019
 Spiegelbilder, Galerie Max Hetzler, London, 2019
 New Paintings, Gagosian, Hong Kong, 2019
 UNFERTIG, Kunstmuseum St. Gallen, St. Gallen, 2019
 Drawings, Gagosian at 420a North Camden Drive, Beverly Hills, 2019
 Sexe, Religion, Politique, Gagosian Gallery, Paris, 2018
 Cows by the Water, Pinault Collection, Palazzo Grassi, Venice
 Albert Oehlen / Julian Schnabel, Galerie Max Hetzler, Berlin (catalogue), 2018
 Albert Oehlen and Peppi Bottrop: Line packers”, Marciano Art Foundation, Los Angeles, 2018
 Elevator Paintings: Trees, Gagosian Gallery, New York, 2017
 Ö, Museo Nacional de Bellas Artes, Havana, 2017
 Jahn und Jahn, Munich, 2017
 Recent Works, Guggenheim Bilbao, Bilbao, 2016
 Works on Paper, Galerie Max Hetzler, Berlin (catalogue), Gagosian Gallery, London, 2016
 Gagosian Gallery, New York, 2015
 Albert Oehlen: Rawhide, Corbett vs. Dempsey Gallery, Chicago, 2015
 Albert Oehlen: Home and Garden, New Museum, New York (catalogue, 2015
 An Old Painting in Spirit, Kunsthalle Zürich, Zurich, 2015
 Fabric Paintings, Skarstedt Gallery, New York, 2014
 Die 5000 Finger von Dr. Ö, Museum Wiesbaden, Wiesbaden, 2014
 Interieurs, Galerie Max Hetzler, Berlin, 2013
 Albert Oehlen / John Sparagana, Studiolo, Zurich, 2013
 Albert Oehlen - Recent work, Gagosian Gallery, Geneva, 2013
 Drawings, Gagosian Gallery, Rome, 2012
 New Paintings, Gagosian Gallery, New York , 2012
 Albert Oehlen Painting, MUMOK, Vienna 2013 
 Albert Oehlen, Carre d'Art, Nîmes, 2011 
 Albert Oehlen, Galerie Nathalie Obadia, Paris, 2011
 Albert Oehlen, Thomas Dane Gallery, London, 2011
 Albert Oehlen, Galerie Max Hetzler, Berlin, 2011
 Albert Oehlen- Fingermalerei, Emil Schumacher Museum, Hagen, Germany 2010
 Albert Oehlen, Alfonso Artiaco, Naples 2010
 Museo di Capodimonte, Naples (retrospective) 2009 
 Galerie Nathalie Obadia, Paris 2008
 Thomas Dane Gallery, London (catalogue) 2008
 Galerie Max Hetzler, Berlin (catalogue) 2008
 Paintings 1988–2008, John Berggruen Gallery, San Francisco, 2008
 Juana de Aizpuru, Madrid 2008
 Drei Amigos!, Galerie Bärbel Grässlin, Frankfurt, 2007
 Prints (with Christopher Wool), 1018 ART, New York City 2007
 Albert Oehlen- I Will Always Champion Good Painting, Whitechapel Gallery, London 2006
 Painter of Light, Luhring Augustine Gallery, New York 2006
 Galerie Max Hetzler, Berlin 2006
 Albert Oehlen – I Will Always Champion Bad Painting, Arnolfini, Bristol, 2006
 Museum Dhondt-Dhaenens, Deurle, Belgium 2006
 Albert Oehlen – New Paintings and Collages, Thomas Dane, London, 2005
 I know whom you showed last summer, Museum of Modern Art, Miami, 2005
 Albert Oehlen. Paintings 1980–1981, Skarstedt Fine Art, New York 2005
 FRAC Auvergne – Ecuries de Chazerat, Clermont-Ferrand, France (catalog) 2005
 Spiegelbilder 1982–1985, Galerie Max Hetzler, Berlin 2005
 Galerie Nathalie Obadia, Paris 2005
 Albert Oehlen, Malerei 1980–2004, Selbstportrait mit 50millionenfacher Lichtgeschwindigkeit, Kunsthalle Nürnberg, Nuremberg, 2005
 Selbstportrait mit 50millionenfacher Lichtgeschwindigkeit, Musée Cantonale des Beaux Arts, Lausanne (catalog) 2004
 Albert Oehlen, Malerei 1980–2004, Contemporary Fine Arts, Berlin 2004
 Luhring Augustine Gallery, New York 2004
 Spezialbilder – Albert Oehlen / Jonathan Meese, Galerie Max Hetzler, Berlin 2004
 Nolan/Eckman Gallery, New York, 2003
 Musée d'Art Moderne et Contemporain de Strasbourg (catalogue) 2002
 Galerie Nathalie Obadia, Paris 2002
 Patrick Painter, Inc., Santa Monica 2002
 Pinturas y Dibujos 2002
 Terminale Erfrischung: Computercollagen und Malerei, Kestner-Gesellschaft, Hannover (catalog) 2001
 Der Ritt der sieben Nutten – das war mein Jahrhundert (with Markus Oehlen), Städtisches Museum Abteiberg, Mönchengladbach (catalogue) 2000
 Höre auf zu arbeiten, die Erregung nimmt Dir die Kraft, Galerie Gisela Capitain, Cologne 2000
 Albert Oehlen. Malerei, Kunsthalle Vierseithof, Luckenwalde (catalog) & Bernier / Eliades, Athens, 2000
 refuse, light and a joke invented in drunkenness, Luhring Augustine, New York 1999
 Albert Oehlen. Malerei, Kunsthalle Vierseithof, Luckenwalde (catalogue) 1997
 IVAM Centre del Carme, Valencia (catalogue) 1996
 Abortion of the Cool, Gesellschaft für Gegenwartskunst, Augsburg (catalogue) 1995
 Oehlen Williams 95 (with Christopher Williams), Wexner Center for Arts, Columbus, Ohio (catalogue) 1995
 Recent Paintings, The Renaissance Society at the University of Chicago, Chicago 1995
 Realidad Abstracta (with Markus Oehlen), Universidad Internacional Menendez Pelayo, Santander (catalogue) 1990
 Linolschnitte, Forum Stadtpark, Graz (catalogue) 1989
 Abräumung – Prokrustische Malerei 1982 – 84, Kunsthalle Zürich, Zürich (catalogue) 1987

Public collections
 Tate, London
 Fondazione Prada, Milan
 Albertina, Vienna
 Fondation Louis Vuitton, Paris
 Centre Pompidou, Paris
 Städel Museum, Frankfurt am Main
 Kunsthalle Würth
 Museum of Contemporary Art, Chicago
 Art Institute of Chicago, Chicago
 Hill Art Foundation, New York
 ICA, Miami
 Museum of Contemporary Art, Los Angeles
 Museum of Modern Art, New York
 Sammlung Falckenberg – Kulturstiftung Phoenix Art, Hamburg
 Museum Ludwig, Cologne
 Kunstmuseum Bonn
 Kunstraum Grässlin, St. Georgen
 MUDAM-Musée d'Art Moderne Grand-Duc Jean, Luxembourg
 ZKM Museum für Neue Kunst & Medienmuseum, Karlsruhe
 Neue Galeria Graz am Landesmuseum Joanneum, Graz
 Inhotim Centro de Arte Contemporânea, Brumadinho, Brazil
 Sammlung Essl-Kunsthaus, Klosterneuburg
 Museum für Moderne Kunst (MMK), Frankfurt/Main
 Museet for Samtidskkunst, Roskilde, Denmark
 Daimler Contemporary, Berlin
 Museum Moderner Kunst Stiftung Ludwig- MUMOK, Vienna
 FRAC- Ile-de-France Le Plateau, Paris
 Städtisches Museum Abteiberg, Mönchengladbach
 FNAC Fonds National d'Art Contemporain, Puteaux
 The Saatchi Gallery, London
 Musée d'Art Moderne et Contemporain (MAMCS), Strasbourg
 Tervi Flash Art Museum of Contemporary Art, Trevi
 CAC Centro de Arte Contemporáneo Malága, Malága
 de la Cruz Collection – Miami, Florida
 Ståhl Collection, Norrköping, Sweden

References

External links
 Albert Oehlen at Gagosian Gallery
 Galerie Max Hetzler, Artist Page
 Albert Oehlen exhibition catalogue to accompany his show at Thomas Dane Gallery, London in 2008
 (O'Brien, Glen) Interview Magazine article
 Oeheln – Patrick Painter
 Luhring Augustine Gallery.
 The Saatchi Gallery; About Albert Oehlen and his art Additional information on Albert Oehlen including artworks, text panels, articles, and full biography

1954 births
Abstract painters
Living people
20th-century German painters
20th-century German male artists
German male painters
21st-century German painters
21st-century German male artists
People from Krefeld
German contemporary artists
Red Krayola members
University of Fine Arts of Hamburg alumni